Emelie Sederholm (born 1994), also known by her stage name Venior, is a Finnish singer-songwriter from Kauniainen, Finland. She is based in Stockholm, Sweden.  She is currently working on her debut album while also writing for other artists.

She released her first single "Breathe Deep, Fall Slowly" in January 2012 at the age of 17.

Sederholm has lived in Stockholm, London, and Berlin.

Discography

Singles

 Breathe Deep, Fall Slowly (2012)

References

1994 births
21st-century Finnish women singers
Living people
Finnish songwriters
Finnish expatriates in England
Finnish expatriates in Germany
Finnish expatriates in Sweden
People from Kauniainen